The Tree That Owns Itself is an oak tree in Eufaula, Alabama. A tree in the same location was given its freedom by E. H. Graves, the mayor of Eufaula, in 1935. Confederate soldier Captain John A. Walker previously owned the land that the tree is on, so the original tree was known as the Walker Oak. The deed also named the tree as the Post Oak Tree. The original Walker Oak was destroyed in 1961 after it was hit by a tornado, and a new tree was planted by the International Paper Company to replace it. An iron sign was affixed to the railings surrounding the new tree; at some point after 1961, the word "Post" was removed from the sign and it was then known only as Oak Tree. The new tree was subsequently replaced again, but each replacement tree has been given the deed to the land.

Deed 
In 1935, former mayor of Eufaula, E. H. Graves, recorded a deed giving the tree ownership of itself, including its roots, branches, and trunk. It reads:  

All replacement trees have also been given the deed to their land.

Plaque 
There is a large plaque on the fence surrounding the tree. It reads:

See also
List of individual trees
Plant rights
Individual trees in the United States

References

External links
The Other Tree That Owns Itself Tom Scott, 3 December 2018.

Individual trees in Alabama
Individual oak trees
1960s individual tree deaths
Tourist attractions in Barbour County, Alabama